Vice Admiral John Hunter (29 August 1737 – 13 March 1821) was an officer of the Royal Navy, who succeeded Arthur Phillip as the second Governor of New South Wales, serving from 1795 to 1800.

Both a sailor and a scholar, he explored the Parramatta River as early as 1788, and was the first to surmise that Tasmania might be an island. As governor, he tried to combat serious abuses by the military in the face of powerful local interests led by John MacArthur. Hunter's name is commemorated in historic locations such as Hunter Valley and Hunter Street, Sydney.

Family and early life
John Hunter was born in Leith, Scotland, the son of William Hunter, a captain in the merchant service, and Helen, née Drummond, daughter of J. Drummond and niece of George Drummond, several-time lord provost of Edinburgh. As a boy Hunter was sent to live with an uncle in the town of King's Lynn in Norfolk, where, and also at Edinburgh, he received the classical education of the time. Hunter was sent to the University of Edinburgh, but soon left it to join the navy as a captain's servant to Thomas Knackston on HMS Grampus in May 1754.

Naval career

Seven Years' War
While aboard Neptune he was present at the Raid on Rochefort in 1757, and afterwards served during cruises off Brest in 1758 and the capture of Quebec in 1759. Serving aboard Neptune at this time as her first lieutenant was John Jervis, later Earl of St Vincent and First Sea Lord, who became an acquaintance of Hunter.

Hunter spent the rest of the Seven Years' War as midshipman on several of Admiral Philip Durell's flagships, serving aboard HMS Royal Anne,  and the 100-gun , the latter in the Bay of Biscay until the Treaty of Paris ended the war in 1763. Hunter passed examinations and qualified for promotion to lieutenant in February 1760. (He was not, however, appointed lieutenant until 1780.) Hunter remained active in the navy during the years of peace, going out to Newfoundland aboard the frigate  and then serving as master's mate aboard HMS Launceston during her time in North America in 1767 with the fleet under Commodore Samuel Hood. Hood gave Hunter an acting-order as master in 1768, and after passing his exams with Trinity House in 1769, Hunter had the order confirmed. His first appointment was to the 28-gun  for service in the West Indies. Hunter spent his time there making charts and plans of parts of the coast and of the Spanish fortifications at Havana, which he sent back to the Admiralty. Carysfort was nearly lost after running aground on Martyr Reef in the Gulf of Florida in 1771, while being sailed by a pilot, but Hunter's exertions allowed her to be saved with the loss of her masts and guns.

Service in the East Indies
The Kent was at this time commanded by Captain John Jervis, Hunter's companion from HMS Neptune. Jervis took Hunter with him to his next command, . Also serving aboard Foudroyant at this time was Evan Nepean, then the ship's purser, but later a leading civil servant and First Secretary to the Admiralty. From Foudroyant Hunter was moved into  in 1776, at the request of Admiral Lord Howe, who was then going out to North America as commander-in-chief of the fleet, with Eagle as his flagship.

American War of Independence
When the American Revolutionary War broke out, Hunter served under Howe for the duration of his time in command, acting virtually as master of the fleet. He was active in the Chesapeake raid and the expeditions on the Delaware, as well as the defence of Sandy Hook. On Howe's recall, his reputation by now stale with the Sandwich administration, Hunter was not able to have his request to be made lieutenant honoured. Instead he joined the 74-gun  as a volunteer in 1779, under her captain, Keith Stewart. He was appointed lieutenant of HMS Union by Sir Charles Hardy, but the Admiralty refused to confirm the appointment and Hunter returned to the Berwick as a volunteer in 1780, and went out the West Indies. There he received a commission from the commander in chief, Sir George Rodney. Hunter returned to England aboard the Berwick in 1781, and was present at the Battle of Dogger Bank on 5 August that year. Howe appointed him third lieutenant of his flagship  in 1782, and was advanced to first lieutenant by the time she took part in the relief of Gibraltar and the Battle of Cape Spartel. Following these engagements Hunter was appointed to his first command, that of the 14-gun sloop HMS Marquis de Seignelay, on 12 November 1782.

First Fleet
When the preparation of the First Fleet was in progress, Lord Howe, by then first lord of the admiralty, arranged for Hunter to be promoted to post captain on 15 December 1786, and appointed to command . The fleet was under the overall command of Commodore Arthur Phillip who was going out to find and be governor of the new colony of New South Wales. Hunter carried a dormant commission as successor to Phillip if he should have died or was absent.

Explorations around Australia and Tasmania

The expedition arrived in Port Jackson in January 1788. Hunter led an expedition to explore the Parramatta River early in 1788. This expedition explored and made soundings as far as Iron Cove, Five Dock Bay and Hen and Chicken Bay on the Parramatta River. The Sir William Dixson Research Library at the State Library of New South Wales holds the original copy of the chart of the expedition, entitled "Chart of the coasts and harbours of Botany-Bay, Port-Jackson and Broken-Bay, as survey'd by Capt.n John Hunter of H.M.S. Sirius". The expedition was significant because it may have marked the first contact to take place between the British and the Indigenous owners of the land, the Wangal Clan, in 1788. William Bradley's log says that this contact took place while Hunter was having breakfast and is remembered in the name of the suburb, Breakfast Point.

Hunter was ordered to the Cape of Good Hope for supplies in October 1788. He sailed around Cape Horn to the Cape of Good Hope, and from there back to New South Wales in May 1789, thus circumnavigating the globe. The voyage was made more difficult by leaky state of the ship, which rendered continual pumping necessary. Sirius was then refitted and sent to Norfolk Island with a large party of convicts, but was caught in a violent storm while anchored there. She was driven onto a coral reef and wrecked. A number of the crew returned to Port Jackson aboard the brig , the remainder, including Hunter, waited for nearly at year on the island before being taken off. Hunter and some of his men returned to England aboard the chartered Dutch vessel Waaksamheyd after a long and arduous voyage. Finally arriving at Portsmouth in April 1792, Hunter was court-martialled for the loss of the Sirius but was honourably acquitted. Hunter then prepared for publication his interesting An Historical Journal of the Transactions at Port Jackson and Norfolk Island, With the Discoveries That Have Been Made in New South Wales and the Southern Ocean Since the Publication of Phillip's Voyage, published at the beginning of 1793. An abridged edition appeared later in the same year. In the first edition of this work is found the earliest reference to the possibility of there being a strait between the mainland and Tasmania. On page 126 Hunter says: "There is reason thence to believe, that there is in that space either a very deep gulf, or a straight, which may separate Van Diemen's Land from New Holland."

The French Revolutionary Wars having broken out during Hunter's time in England, he went to sea again as a volunteer aboard the 100-gun , the flagship of his old patron Lord Howe. Hunter was present at the Glorious First of June on 1 June 1794, and remained in the ship until 1795. With Arthur Phillip's resignation from the governorship of New South Wales in July 1793, Hunter had applied for the position in October and was appointed governor in January 1794. Various delays occurred, and it was not until February 1795 that he was able to sail. Hunter arrived at Sydney on 7 September 1795 on HMS Reliance and took up the office of governor on 11 September 1795.

Governorship
Hunter's difficulties began before he arrived back in Sydney. Phillip left the colony in 1793, at the end of his term as governor, and for the following two years the military were in complete control. During the lieutenant-governorship of Francis Grose, who unmercifully exploited the convicts, a great traffic in alcoholic spirits sprang up, on which there was an enormous profit for the officers concerned. They had obtained the control of the courts and the management of the lands, public stores, and convict labour. Hunter realised that these powers had to be restored to the civil administration, a difficult task. And in John Macarthur he had an opponent who would ruthlessly defend his commercial interests. Hunter found himself practically helpless. A stronger man might have sent the officers home under arrest, but had Hunter attempted to do so he likely would have precipitated the rebellion which took place in William Bligh's time. Anonymous letters were even sent to the home authorities charging Hunter with participation in the very abuses he was striving to prevent. In spite of Hunter's vehement defence of the charges made against him, he was recalled in a dispatch dated 5 November 1799 from the Duke of Portland, one of the three secretaries of state. Hunter acknowledged this dispatch on 20 April 1800, and left for England on 28 September 1800, handing over the government to Lieutenant-Governor Philip Gidley King. When Hunter arrived he endeavoured to vindicate his character with the authorities but was given no opportunity. Hunter was obliged to state his case in a long pamphlet printed in 1802, Governor Hunter's Remarks on the Causes of the Colonial Expense of the Establishment of New South Wales. Hints for the Reduction of Such Expense and for Reforming the Prevailing Abuses, which has become a valuable document in early Australian history.

Hunter explored and opened up the country near Sydney, and also encouraged the explorations of Matthew Flinders and George Bass. A contemporary, midshipman Daniel Southwell described Hunter as "devoid of stiff pride, most accomplished in his profession, and, to sum up all, a worthy man." But the circumstances in which he was placed made it very difficult for him to be completely successful as a governor. As his successor Philip Gidley King said, his conduct was "guided by the most upright intentions", and he was "most shamefully deceived by those on whom he had every reason to depend for assistance, information, and advice." Of his sojourn in the colony Hunter said that he "could not have had less comfort, although he would certainly have had greater peace of mind, had he spent the time in a penitentiary". His service as Governor was ultimately recognised through the grant of an annual pension of £300, approved by then-Prime Minister Henry Addington in October 1802.

Hunter continued his interest in Australia long after he left it, and the suggested reforms in his pamphlet were of much value. When the platypus was first seen by Europeans in 1798, a pelt and sketch were sent back to the United Kingdom by John Hunter.

Later life and legacy

In summer 1804 Hunter was given command of the 74-gun , serving with the fleet off Brest under Admiral William Cornwallis. While sailing out of Torbay on the evening of 24 November, a sudden fog came down. The ships of the fleet, unaware of each other's positions and their own location became disorganised. Hunter twice narrowly avoided colliding with other ships, but ran aground at 8pm on the cliff near Paignton, and soon afterwards bilged. A gale then struck the area, and with Venerable fast going to pieces, her crew were evacuated with little loss by HMS Impetueux. Hunter again underwent a court-martial, and was again fully acquitted.

Hunter was promoted to rear-admiral on 2 October 1807, and then to vice-admiral on 31 July 1810 but never hoisted his flag at sea. Vice-Admiral John Hunter spent his final years in his home town of Leith, living at 6 Cassels Place. He died at his London home at Judd Street, New Road, Hackney, London on 13 March 1821. His tomb can be seen in the churchyard of St John-at-Hackney.

The Hunter River and Hunter Region north of Sydney are both named after him, as is the suburb of Hunters Hill in Sydney, and (partly) the John Hunter Hospital in Newcastle. In 1986 he was honoured on a postage stamp depicting his portrait issued by Australia Post.

He retired to his home town of Leith and lived at a then-new Georgian house at 5 Cassels Place, part of the still extant Georgian terrace at the foot of Leith Walk, and now renumbered as 34 Leith Walk.

Memorials

A bust of Hunter was placed by the Australian government at the north end of The Shore in Leith in 1996.

See also
 Historical Records of Australia
 Journals of the First Fleet

Notes

References

Bibliography

Further reading
 Barnes, Robert. An unlikely leader: the life and times of Captain John Hunter. Sydney: Sydney University Press, 2009. . 
The Life of John Hunter, Navigator, Governor, Admiral", Arthur Hoyle, Mulini Press, Canberra, 2001
 D. Manning Richards. Destiny in Sydney: An epic novel of convicts, Aborigines, and Chinese embroiled in the birth of Sydney, Australia. First book in Sydney series. Washington DC: Aries Books, 2012. 
 "The HUNTER Sketchbook: Birds & Flowers of New South Wales drawn on the Spot in 1788, 89 & 90 By Captain John Hunter RN of the First Fleet", John Calaby, editor, National Library of Australia, Canberra, 1989

External links

 Portraits of Hunter the National Portrait Gallery, London.
 Chart of the coasts and harbours of Botany-Bay, Port-Jackson and Broken-Bay, as survey'd by Capt.n John Hunter of H.M.S. Sirius
 
 
 

Governors of New South Wales
Royal Navy vice admirals
Royal Navy personnel of the Seven Years' War
Royal Navy personnel of the American Revolutionary War
Royal Navy personnel of the French Revolutionary Wars
Royal Navy personnel of the Napoleonic Wars
1737 births
1821 deaths
Australian bird artists
People from Leith
19th-century Australian people
Colony of New South Wales people
Sea captains
First Fleet